Dimitrinka Todorova (in Bulgarian, Димитринка Тодорова; 1974–2020) was a Bulgarian individual rhythmic gymnast.

She was one of the most successful junior rhythmic gymnasts, winning four gold medals and two silver medals at the 1989 Junior European Championships in Spain, along with her teammates Mila Marinova and Teodora Blagoeva.

She turned senior a year later and finished fourth in the All-Around at the 1990 European championship in Göteborg. She won silver medal for teams with Bulgaria, this time with her teammates Yulia Baycheva and Neli Atanassova; She managed to win two other bronze medals in ribbon and rope finals. She competed at the 1992 European Championship, winning gold team medal, alongside Maria Petrova and Diana Popova. She won another bronze medal in the ball final but finished eighth in the All-Around.

Todorova died of cancer at the age of 46 on March 12, 2020,

References

Dimitrinka Todorova 

Bulgarian athletes
1974 births
2020 deaths